Sir Alan James Mansfield,  (30 September 1902 – 17 July 1980) was an Australian barrister, judge, and the 18th Governor of Queensland, serving from 1966 until 1972.

Early life
Mansfield was born on 20 September 1902 in Brisbane, Queensland, where his family had land in Gumdale. He lived in the Mount Gravatt area for many years. Sir James Mansfield was his great-great-grandfather. He was educated at the Anglican Church Grammar School in Brisbane, before winning a scholarship to the Sydney Church of England Grammar School (Shore). He attended university at St Paul's College, University of Sydney.

Judicial career
Mansfield was appointed as a Puisne Judge on the Supreme Court of Queensland on 17 May 1940. He served with distinction in that capacity until he was made a Senior Puisne Judge on 20 March 1947. As a Senior Puisne Judge, he served until 8 February 1956 when he was promoted to the position of Chief Justice of the Supreme Court of Queensland. He served as Chief Justice from 9 February 1956 until his retirement on 21 February 1966.

Vice-regal career
During his time as Chief Judge, Mansfield was Lieutenant-Governor of Queensland on several occasions. He was appointed Governor of Queensland in 1966. He served in this position until 1972.

Mansfield was a freemason. During his term as governor, he was also Grand Master of the Grand Lodge of Queensland.

Other professional achievements
When Mansfield first became a lawyer, he went to represent Australia on the International Military Tribunal for the Far East for the United Nations War Crimes Commission.

In 1966, in addition to his other duties, Mansfield was also appointed Chancellor of the University of Queensland.

Honours
In 1958 he was made a Knight Commander of the Order of St Michael and St George (KCMG).
The suburb of Mansfield in the city of Brisbane is named after him.

See also
Judiciary of Australia
List of Judges of the Supreme Court of Queensland

References

Governors of Queensland
Australian Knights Commander of the Order of St Michael and St George
Australian Knights Commander of the Royal Victorian Order
Chief Justices of Queensland
Judges of the Supreme Court of Queensland
20th-century Australian judges
Prosecutors of the International Military Tribunal for the Far East
People educated at Anglican Church Grammar School
1902 births
1980 deaths
20th-century Australian lawyers